Rheinhausen can refer to several towns in Germany:
 Rheinhausen, a district of the city of Duisburg
 Oberhausen-Rheinhausen, near Karlsruhe, Baden-Wurttemberg
 Rheinhausen (Breisgau), in southwestern Baden-Wurttemberg